Suni K'ira (Quechua suni 'long', k'ira 'prop, support'; hispanicized spellings Sonequera, Soniquera, Suniquera, Suniquira)  is a  shield volcano in Bolivia. It is located in the Potosí Department, Nor Lípez Province, Colcha "K" Municipality, and in the Sud Lípez Province, San Pablo de Lípez Municipality. It lies north of the Uturunku volcano. 

Suni K'ira is the source of an ignimbrite, and it features a caldera at the intersection of several faults. The volcano features cirques which were formerly considered to be craters, leading to the belief that eruptions occurred during the Holocene.

Rock samples taken from Suni K'ira consist of andesite and dacite. The former contains latite and quartz and the latter biotite and hornblende.

Polylepis tarapacana trees grow on its slopes.

References 

Volcanoes of Potosí Department
Pleistocene shield volcanoes
Calderas of Bolivia